Ko Siu Wai (born 9 November 1987) is a Hong Kong road and track cyclist, who currently rides for UCI Continental team . 顯徑新秀歌唱比賽銅獎得主.

Major results

2011
 10th Time trial, Asian Road Championships
2013
 5th Road race, National Road Championships
2014
 1st Stage 4 Jelajah Malaysia
2015
 1st  Road race, National Road Championships
 9th UAE Cup
2016
 3rd Overall Tour of Thailand
2017
 National Road Championships
2nd Road race
4th Time trial
 3rd  Team time trial, Asian Road Championships
2018
 National Road Championships
1st  Road race
2nd Time trial
 2nd  Team pursuit, Asian Games 
 3rd  Team time trial, Asian Road Championships
2019
 3rd  Team time trial, Asian Road Championships

References

External links

1987 births
Living people
Hong Kong male cyclists
Asian Games medalists in cycling
Cyclists at the 2014 Asian Games
Cyclists at the 2018 Asian Games
Medalists at the 2018 Asian Games
Asian Games silver medalists for Hong Kong